Frank A. Giufre (born April 5, 1977) is an American football coach. He is the offensive line coach at Fordham University, a position he has held since 2023. Giufre served as the offensive coordinator at the University of Connecticut from 2019 to 2021.

Coaching career

UConn
Giufre was hired as UConn's offensive line coach in 2017 after spending the previous six seasons with the Indianapolis Colts of the National Football League (NFL). In February 2019, Giufre was promoted to offensive coordinator.

References

External links
 Fordham profile
 UConn profile

1977 births
Living people
American football centers
American football offensive guards
Fordham Rams football coaches
Indianapolis Colts coaches
Maine Black Bears football coaches
Miami Hurricanes football coaches
Sacred Heart Pioneers football coaches
UConn Huskies football coaches
Syracuse Orange football players
High school football coaches in New York (state)
People from Canastota, New York